Rockwood is a neighborhood in the northwest section of Gresham, Oregon.

History
In the late 19th century, a stone marker was placed every mile east of the courthouse in Portland, resulting in a "Base Line Road" along the Willamette Baseline: Rockwood developed at the 10-mile mark, in a rocky and wooded area that was later the inspiration for the name of the community.  A Ten-Mile Inn located in present-day Rockwood became a stagecoach stop, a junction that also attracted a school, a grange hall, a church, a grocery store, among other businesses.

The Rockwood area was annexed by Gresham in the mid-1980s.

Demographics
The Rockwood neighborhood is situated in the zip codes 97233 and 97230 and based on 2010 census data (estimating 97233 zip also in Portland boundaries) has a population of approximately 28.000 people - approximately 1/3 of the population of Gresham. The census tracts included are: 98.01, 97.02, 96.06, 96.05, 96.04, 96.03. This neighborhood makes up much of the westernmost boundary of Gresham as it connects to Portland.

The income range/household median income falls below the average income for the Multnomah County area where it is located.  Within the County, the areas in Rockwood are within the ten lowest income zip codes east of the Willamette River.

Public services
Since 2003, a  area of Rockwood has been included in a Gresham-Rockwood Urban Renewal Area.

Rockwood is served by the Rockwood / East 188th Avenue light-rail station on the MAX Blue Line.  The neighborhood has been the site of a branch of the Multnomah County Library since 1963.

In April 2010, decades after a 1960s state law required Multnomah County to provide a court services in Gresham for residents east of 122nd Avenue, the county's Board of Commissioners approving a resolution that calls for the construction of a courthouse in Rockwood by 2012.

References

External links
Rockwood Community Development Corporation
Rockwood Business Coalition
Fairview-Rockwood-Wilkes Historical Society

Neighborhoods in Oregon
Gresham, Oregon